The 2015 season was the Cleveland Browns' 63rd in the National Football League, their 67th overall, and the second and final season under the head coach/general manager tandem of Mike Pettine and Ray Farmer. Both Pettine and Farmer were fired on January 3, 2016, after the team failed to improve on their 7–9 record from the previous season, going 3–13 season, tied with the Tennessee Titans for the worst record in the league. The Browns introduced new uniforms prior to the start of the season, updating the orange color to a darker hue, among other changes.

Offseason

Personnel changes
On January 8, offensive coordinator Kyle Shanahan left the Browns due to disagreements about the quarterback Johnny Manziel's readiness to start. Quarterbacks coach Dowell Loggains was fired the same day. Notably, Loggains was instrumental in the team's drafting of Manziel in the 2014 NFL Draft. On January 15, wide receivers coach Mike McDaniel left the Browns by mutual agreement.

On January 21, John DeFilippo was hired as the Browns’ new offensive coordinator. DeFilippo, who has been the Oakland Raiders’ quarterbacks coach for the past three seasons, replaces Kyle Shanahan, who resigned earlier in the month. After his first stint as the Raiders’ quarterbacks coach (2007–08), DeFilippo worked with HC Mike Pettine for one successful season with the New York Jets. Under DeFilippo's guidance, rookie quarterback Mark Sanchez showed enough poise to lead New York to the AFC Championship. Pettine was the Jets’ defensive coordinator that season.

On January 27, Joker Phillips was hired as wide receivers coach.

On January 31, Kevin O'Connell accepted the position of quarterbacks coach.

Roster changes

Free agents

Releases

Signings

2015 draft class

Notes
 The Browns acquired additional selections in the first (No. 19) and fourth (No. 111) rounds as part of a trade that sent the team's 2014 first-round selection to the Buffalo Bills.
 The Browns acquired an additional sixth-round (No. 202) selection in a trade that sent the team's 2014 seventh-round selection to the Baltimore Ravens.
 The Browns have traded picks in Round 2 (No. 51 for No. 43) with the Houston Texans for additional picks and upgrades in the later rounds in this years' draft (see above for updated selections). They also made swaps for higher picks with the Arizona Cardinals in rounds 4-7.

Gordon suspension
On January 25, it was announced that wide receiver Josh Gordon was facing a year-long suspension following a fifth failed drug test, this time for alcohol. This follows a 10-game suspension in 2014 for testing positive for marijuana. On February 3, the league imposed the suspension without pay for at least one year, possibly indefinitely. His earliest return would be training camp for the 2016 season.

Manziel enters rehab
On February 3, 2015, quarterback Johnny Manziel voluntarily entered a rehab facility for dependence on alcohol. He exited the facility on April 12, shortly prior to the beginning of offseason workouts.

GM Farmer suspension
In an incident widely dubbed as Textgate, it was announced on February 4 that the Browns faced sanctions amid allegations of text messages being sent from general manager Ray Farmer to coaches and coordinators during games during the 2014 season, a violation of NFL rules. On March 30, 2015 it was announced Ray Farmer was suspended for the first four games of the season without pay and the Browns were fined $250,000 for the incident. No loss of current or future draft picks were imposed.

Logo and uniform changes
The Browns introduced new logos on February 24. The helmet remains the primary logo, changing the team's orange color to a darker hue, and changing the facemask from gray to brown. The team also premiered a secondary logo, which is a simplistic helmet, and a new logo for the Dawg Pound.

On April 14, the Browns premiered nine new uniforms. There are three jersey colors and three pants colors: orange, brown, and white, allowing for nine possible uniform combinations. The uniforms have "Cleveland" above the numbers on the front, "Browns" down the leg, and "Dawg Pound" inside the collar. The uniforms are the first in the NFL to utilize contrast stitching and chainmail/raised numbers. The team name down the leg are also NFL firsts.

Preseason

Schedule
This was the first preseason in 13 years in which the Great Lakes Classic was not played against the rival Detroit Lions.

Moeller suspended
On September 7, the Browns suspended offensive line coach Andy Moeller indefinitely in response to an alleged assault Moeller was being investigated for. He and the Browns mutually parted ways before the team's game on September 27.

Regular season

Schedule

Note: Intra-division opponents are in bold text.

Game summaries

Week 1: at New York Jets

The Jets routed the Browns 31-10.  Late in the first quarter, the Browns' starting quarterback, Josh McCown, fumbled the football in the Jets' endzone and suffered a concussion.  He was ruled out and replaced by Johnny Manziel for the remainder of the contest.  The Browns led 10-7 late in the first half, but the Jets scored a touchdown late in the second quarter to lead 14-10 at halftime.  In the second half, the Browns failed to score while the Jets scored 17 unanswered points to turn it into a blowout.  The Browns committed 5 turnovers in the game, with 4 of them being lost fumbles.  They also committed 12 penalties, losing 109 yards.

With the loss, the Browns opened the season at 0-1.  They lost their 11th straight season opener, extending their NFL record for the most consecutive season opening losses by a franchise in NFL history.

Week 2: vs. Tennessee Titans

In the team's home opener, former Heisman Trophy winners Johnny Manziel and Marcus Mariota started against each other, and the two combined for over 400 yards with each having a pair of TD's and no INT's. After the Browns led 21-0 at halftime, Anthony Fasano and Dexter McCluster factored in each of the scoring drives for Tennessee, as defensive containment limited Mariota for most of the game. The Titans cut the deficit to 21-14 late in the 4th quarter.  On their next drive, the Browns reached midfield and faced 3rd and 2.  On a broken play, Manziel found Benjamin and threw a touchdown to put the Browns up 28-14.  The Titans reached the red zone on their next drive, but Mariota fumbled and lost the ball, allowing the Browns to run out the clock.  After committing 5 turnovers in their season opener, the Browns had 0 turnovers while forcing 3 Titans turnovers.  For Cleveland, Armonty Bryant led the Browns with 2.5 sacks (of the 7 total) as they pressured the Titans to turn over the ball 3 times, and a selection for AFC Special Teams Player of the Week was bestowed upon WR/KR Travis Benjamin, who had 269 all-purpose yards, including a 78-yard punt return TD.

With the win, the Browns ended their six-game losing streak and improved to 1-1 on the season.  Benjamin's 3 TD's were all over 50 yards, becoming only the third player in NFL history to have three 50+ yard touchdowns in the same game.

Week 3: vs. Oakland Raiders

The Raiders opened the scoring on their first drive of the game, settling for a field goal to take a 3-0 lead.  The Browns failed to score and trailed 3-0 after the first quarter. The Raiders scored a second quarter touchdown to take a 10-0 lead.  Late in the half, the Browns reached the Raiders' 1 yard line and had 1st and goal at the 1.  However, they failed to get into the end zone in three attempts.  After a false start penalty on 4th and goal, the Browns settled for a field goal to cut the deficit to 10-3.  With less than 2 minutes remaining in the half, the Raiders drove down the field, and QB Derek Carr threw a touchdown pass, giving the Raiders a 17-3 lead at halftime.  Early in the third quarter, the Raiders kicked another field goal and went up 20-3.  The Browns finally reached the end zone in the third quarter as QB Josh McCown completed a 28-yard pass to TE Gary Barnidge, cutting it to 20-10.  The Raiders scored another touchdown early in the 4th quarter, and the Browns trailed 27-10.  At that moment, the Browns began to mount a 4th quarter rally.  K Travis Coons kicked a field goal to pull within 27-13.  The Raiders turned the ball over in their own territory on their next drive, and the Browns scored another touchdown to cut the deficit to 27-20.  The Browns' defense forced a 3 and out, and the Raiders were forced to punt.  However, Travis Benjamin muffed the punt, and the Raiders recovered it.  The Raiders ran three more plays before they punted again, pinning the Browns at their own 2-yard line.  The Browns had one last chance to score a game saving touchdown.  Within 2 minutes, they reached the Raiders' 29-yard line.  After McCown was sacked, the Browns faced 3rd and 14 on the Raiders' 34-yard line with under 45 seconds to play.  At that moment, McCown threw a pass that was intercepted by Charles Woodson.  With no timeouts remaining, the Raiders were able to kneel and run out the clock.

With the loss, the Browns dropped to 1-2.

Week 4: at San Diego Chargers

The Browns were making their first trip to San Diego since 2006.  The game was back and forth, with neither team leading by more than one possession.  The Chargers led 7-3 after the 1st quarter.  On the Browns' first drive of the second quarter, QB Josh McCown threw a 34-yard touchdown pass to RB Duke Johnson to put the Browns up 10-7.  The teams traded field goals, making it a 13-13 game at halftime.  The Browns scored a field goal at the start of the 3rd quarter to go up 16-13.  On the Chargers' next drive, QB Philip Rivers led the Chargers to a touchdown, going up 20-16 heading into the 4th quarter.  After K Travis Coons kicked a field goal to cut the deficit to 20-19, Rivers led another touchdown drive to put the Chargers up 27-19.  On the Browns' next drive, they reached the end zone, assisted by an incredible catch by TE Gary Barnidge on the Chargers' 1 yard line.  They converted on the two-point conversion to tie the game at 27-27 with just over 2 minutes remaining.  The Chargers reached the Browns' 24-yard line with under 50 seconds to play.  The Browns began to use timeouts until the Chargers faced 4th down with 2 seconds to play.  After the Chargers called timeout, their kicker had an opportunity to win the game with a 39-yard field goal.  The 39-yard game winning attempt was off to the right, and the game appeared to be on its way to overtime..  However, CB Tramon Williams was flagged for being offside during the play, giving the Chargers another attempt, this time from 34 yards.  The field goal was converted, and the Chargers won 30-27.  The Browns committed 12 penalties in the game, including this critical offside penalty.

With the loss, the Browns fell to 1-3.

Week 5: at Baltimore Ravens

The Browns opened division play in a week 5 battle with the Baltimore Ravens.  Ravens QB Joe Flacco entered this game with a 13-1 record against the Browns. The Ravens' defense was strong, limiting the running game to just 9 yards on the first 8 attempts, with constant blitz pressure forcing Browns QB Josh McCown to make the right reads on his passes. The Ravens led 14-3 after the first quarter and 21-9 early in the third quarter.  At that point, the Browns began to come back.  The Browns scored a touchdown to make it 21-16 heading into the 4th quarter.  Connecting with TE Gary Barnidge on an 80-yd drive in the fourth quarter, the Browns led for the first time at 22-21. Teams then traded scores, with the Ravens leading 27-22, then the Browns leading 30-27 with three minutes left in regulation.  The Ravens used those three minutes to drive down the field and tie the game with a field goal. Tied at 30 after regulation, the game headed into overtime. The Ravens got the ball first. The Browns' defense forced a 3-and-out, and Travis Benjamin set up the punt at the Brown's 35. The Ravens failed to force a punt or turnover as the Browns drove down the field to the Ravens' 14-yard line, where K Travis Coons would kick the game-winning field goal .

McCown completed passes to nine different receivers; four of them—Gary Barnidge, Travis Benjamin, Andrew Hawkins and Taylor Gabriel—had six or more receptions. He finished 36/51 for a career-high 457 yards with two passing touchdowns and a rushing touchdown. McCown also became the first quarterback in franchise history to throw 300+ passing yards in three straight games.  The Browns ran the ball 25 times, with seven carries in overtime to set up the game-winning field goal by Coons, who is now 10-for-10 to start his career.

With the win, the Browns improved to 2-3.  The Browns snapped a five-game losing streak in away games and a seven-game losing streak in Baltimore.  This was also the Browns' first overtime win since November 18, 2007, coincidentally a 33-30 victory over the Ravens in Baltimore, in the infamous "Dawson Bar" Game.

For his performance, QB Josh McCown was named AFC Offensive Player of the Week.

This game would be the last away win for the Cleveland Browns until Week 12 of the 2018 season when they defeated the Bengals in Cincinnati (the Browns would lose 25 straight away games, one short of the NFL record). It would also be the last time the Browns would defeat an AFC North rival until Week 5 of the 2018 season, when they would defeat the Ravens.

Week 6: vs. Denver Broncos

The Browns entered this game hoping to knock off the unbeaten Denver Broncos.  The Broncos' defense dominated the first half as the Browns trailed 10-0 at halftime.  The Browns had 94 yards of offense, their lowest total yards in a half this season.  The Broncos' offense scored a field goal while CB Aqib Talib picked off QB Josh McCown and scored a defensive touchdown.  On the Browns' first drive of the second half, they went 72 yards and McCown threw a touchdown pass to TE Gary Barnidge to cut the deficit to 10-7.  The Broncos kicked a field goal late in the third quarter and took a 13-7 lead into the fourth quarter.  Early in the fourth quarter, the Broncos extended the lead to 16-7.  The Browns went down the field as McCown and Barnidge connected on another touchdown, cutting the deficit to 16-14.  On the Broncos' next drive, Denver QB Peyton Manning threw an interception to LB Karlos Dansby, which was returned for a touchdown.  The Browns took their first lead of the game, going up 20-16.  The Browns attempted a two-point conversion which would have given them a 6-point lead, but failed. On the first play of the Broncos' next drive, Manning threw a 72-yard touchdown pass to Sanders, and the Broncos reclaimed the lead at 23-20.  The teams traded punts before the Browns tied the game with a field goal, making it 23-23.  On the Broncos' next drive, the Browns forced a three and out.  The Browns reached the Broncos' 46-yard line and were approaching field goal range.  However, McCown threw an interception on 2nd and 10.  The Broncos went three and out again and were forced to punt. The Browns took a knee, and the game went into overtime.

In overtime, The Broncos won the coin toss and elected to receive.  On 3rd and 2, Manning threw an interception to LB Barkevious Mingo, who ran it back to the Broncos' 39-yard line.  The Browns  were approaching field goal range and would win the game with a field goal.  However, they lost 13 yards on the next three plays and were forced to punt.  The Broncos reached the Browns' 16-yard line on their next drive, and their kicker Brandon McManus successfully converted the 34-yard game-winning field goal.

With the loss, the Browns fell to 2-4.

Week 7: at St. Louis Rams

The Rams routed the Browns 24-6. The Browns committed turnovers by fumbling on their first two drives, one of which was run back for a defensive touchdown while the other resulted in a Rams field goal to put the Browns behind 10-0. The Browns kicked two field goals and cut the deficit to 10-6, but the offense stalled afterwards. The Rams would force two more turnovers via fumbles and Rams RB Todd Gurley scored two more touchdowns to go up 24-6 early in the 4th quarter and put the game away.

With the loss, the Browns fell to 2-5.

Week 8: vs. Arizona Cardinals

The Cardinals received the ball first and scored on an 82-yard touchdown drive to go up 7-0. After a turnover, the Browns tied the game up at 7-7. The Browns later scored two more touchdowns to go up 20-7. The Cardinals drove into the red zone, but Cardinals WR Larry Fitzgerald turned the ball over with a fumble. After the Browns went 3 and out, the Cardinals drove down the field and kicked a field goal to cut the deficit to 20-10 heading into halftime.
The Cardinals dominated the second half.  They scored 14 unanswered points to go up 24-20 heading into the 4th quarter. The Cardinals committed a turnover on their own 20-yard line late in the third quarter, but McCown threw an interception into the endzone on the Browns' next drive.  The Cardinals scored another touchdown on their next drive, going up 31-20.  After the Browns turned it over, the Cardinals kicked a field goal to make it 34-20.  With QB Josh McCown injured, backup Johnny Manziel entered the game on the Browns' final drive.  However, the Browns were able to gain only one first down before turning it over on downs and effectively ending the game.

With the loss, the Browns fell to 2-6.

Week 9: at Cincinnati Bengals

In a Thursday Night Football matchup, the Bengals defeated the Browns 31-10. Browns QB Johnny Manziel made his fourth career start and second of this season in place of the injured Josh McCown. The Browns received the ball first and punted after gaining only one first down. The Bengals would score a touchdown on their opening drive to take a 7-0 lead. The Browns reached the Bengals' 4-yard line, but they were unable to reach the end zone and had to settle for a field goal. Leading 7-3 after the first quarter, the Bengals scored an early second quarter touchdown to go up 14-3.  The Browns marched down 93 yards and scored a touchdown to cut the deficit to 14-10 heading into halftime.

However, the Bengals dominated the second half as the Browns would not record a single first down until the 3-minute mark of the 4th quarter and had only 2 first downs for the entire second half. The Bengals would score another touchdown to go up 24-10 early in the 4th quarter. After a 3-and-out from the Browns, the Bengals scored another touchdown on their next drive to take a 31-10 lead. The Browns attempted to respond, but they could not gain a first down and punted again. Late in the game, the Browns blocked a Bengals punt and had the ball at Cincinnati's 37-yard line. They had two first downs on the drive, but they failed to score a touchdown and eventually turned the ball over on downs with 44 seconds left in the game, allowing the Bengals to run out the clock.

With the loss, the Browns' record dropped to 2-7.

Week 10: at Pittsburgh Steelers

The Browns entered into their divisional rivalry game with the Pittsburgh Steelers, having lost 19 of their last 22 meetings and 11 straight games at Heinz Field.  Neither team's designated starting quarterback would start the game as Josh McCown had a rib injury and Steelers' QB Ben Roethlisberger had a foot injury.  Pittsburgh QB Landry Jones would leave the game in the first quarter with an injury, forcing Roethlisberger into the game. Leading 6-3 after the 1st quarter, the Steelers would take control of the game in the 2nd quarter, scoring two touchdowns and taking a 21-3 lead into halftime.  Steelers kicker Chris Boswell added a field goal in the third quarter. Early in the fourth quarter, the Browns retaliated with a Johnny Manziel touchdown pass to Gary Barnidge to cut Pittsburgh's lead to 24-9, but a late Steelers touchdown gave them a 30-9 lead, which would end up being the final score.

Coming off the bench, Roethlisberger passed for 379 yards and three touchdowns, two of which went to WR Antonio Brown who recorded 139 yards, and one to WR Martavis Bryant who led the Steelers with 178 receiving yards. In the loss, Manziel passed for a career-high 372 yards and a touchdown, but he threw a key interception in the red zone with the second play of the 4th quarter. Also, the Steelers defense sacked Manziel six times.

With the loss, the Browns entered their bye week at 2-8 and had sole possession of the NFL's worst record.

Week 12: vs. Baltimore Ravens

ESPN's Monday Night Football returned to Cleveland for the first time in 7 years in a repeat of the AFC North Division rivals.

With just 3 seconds left to play in regulation with the game tied at 27-27, Browns kicker Travis Coons lined up for what would have been the game-winning field goal, but the kick was blocked at the line of scrimmage, which was the rookie's first miss of the season.  Ravens safety Will Hill then scooped up the live ball and returned it 64 yards for the game-winning touchdown as time expired. Their record is now 2-14 all time against the Ravens in the Harbaugh-Flacco era.

With the loss, the Browns dropped to 2-9, which guaranteed them their 8th consecutive losing season. Critics would later evaluate the contest as one of the Top-5 worst defeats in the history of the Browns and the city of Cleveland.

Week 13: vs. Cincinnati Bengals

The Bengals dominated the Browns in every aspect of the game en route to a crushing 37-3 win. The Browns started third-string quarterback Austin Davis, as Josh McCown was placed on IR earlier that week and Johnny Manziel was being disciplined for his antics during the team's bye week.  Davis threw for 230 yards and an interception, while his counterpart, Bengals QB Andy Dalton threw two touchdown passes to A. J. Green and Marvin Jones while running for a touchdown himself.

With their seventh straight loss, the Browns dropped to 2-10 and became the first team in the league to be mathematically eliminated from playoff contention for the season. This marked the 13th straight year that the team missed the playoffs. It was also their 13th consecutive loss in the month of the December. The 34-point margin of defeat was the team's largest since Week 16 of the 2005 season, when they lost to the Pittsburgh Steelers by 41-0.

Week 14: vs. San Francisco 49ers

With the win, the Browns snapped their 7-game losing streak and improved to 3-10. This is the Browns' last win until Week 16, 2016 against the San Diego Chargers.

Week 15: at Seattle Seahawks

With the loss, the Browns fell to 3-11.

Week 16: at Kansas City Chiefs

The Browns fall to 3-12 with the loss.  With the Ravens' win over the Steelers, they are assured last place in the AFC North for the season.

Week 17: vs. Pittsburgh Steelers

The Steelers made the playoffs with a dominating 28-12 win over the Browns (coupled with a Jets loss to the Bills).  The game was competitive for three-quarters, but the Browns failed to get into the endzone, scoring 4 field goals and committing 3 turnovers (2 of them in the 4th quarter, both of which resulted in Steelers scores).

The Browns finished the season with a 3-13 record, their worst record since the 2000 season (when they also went 3-13).  It was tied for their second fewest wins in a season, ahead of only the 1999 Browns, who won 2 games and went 2-14 that season.  GM Ray Farmer was immediately fired after the final game, along with head coach Mike Pettine, who had lost 18 of his last 21 games going back to Week 13 of the previous season.

2016 Pro Bowl 
Despite the team's awful performance on the field, T Joe Thomas and C Alex Mack were invited to the 2016 Pro Bowl.  This marks Thomas' 9th consecutive Pro Bowl selection and ties him with Hall of Famers Lou Groza and Jim Brown for the most pro bowl selections in Browns history.  This marks Mack's 3rd appearance in the game.

Special teamer Johnson Bademosi, TE Gary Barnidge, and WR Travis Benjamin were named as alternates at their respective positions.

Standings

Division

Conference

Staff

Final roster

References

External links
   
 2015 Cleveland Browns at Pro Football Reference (Profootballreference.com)
 2015 Cleveland Browns Statistics at jt-sw.com
 2015 Cleveland Browns Schedule at jt-sw.com
 2015 Cleveland Browns at DatabaseFootball.com  

Cleveland
Cleveland Browns seasons
Cleveland Browns